Flight 965 may refer to

 Air Wisconsin Flight 965 (1980, Nebraska, USA), crashed in extreme weather conditions 
 American Airlines Flight 965 (1995, Colombia), crashed into mountains — navigational error 

0965